Joseph Carter Clark (1874 – unknown) was a Scottish footballer. His regular position was as an inside forward. He was born in Dundee.

He played for Dundee, Brighton United, Newton Heath, Dunfermline Athletic and East Fife.

References

External links
MUFCInfo.com profile

1874 births
Scottish footballers
Footballers from Dundee
Manchester United F.C. players
Dundee F.C. players
Year of death missing
Brighton United F.C. players
Dunfermline Athletic F.C. players
East Fife F.C. players
Association football inside forwards